Gröndal is a neighbourhood of Malmö in the Borough of Hyllie, Malmö Municipality, Skåne County, Sweden.

References

Neighbourhoods of Malmö